Zdeněk Prokeš (born 13 June 1953) is a retired Czech footballer who played as a central defender. He started his career at Dukla Praha club in 1972, moving to Bohemians Praha during the 1974-1975 season, where he made 294 appearances and scored 18 goals. He transferred in Germany to TSV 1860 Munchen club in 1985 and had 87 appearances and scored 18 times.

He was selected 19 times in the national team of Czechoslovakia and scored 1 goal.

Honours

 1982–83 Czechoslovak First League

External links
 
 

1953 births
Living people
Czech footballers
Association football defenders
Bohemians 1905 players
TSV 1860 Munich players
Czechoslovakia international footballers
Czechoslovak expatriate footballers
Czechoslovak footballers
Expatriate footballers in West Germany